The bigeye rockling (Gaidropsarus macrophthalmus) is a species of fish in the family Lotidae.

Description

It is silvery-pink in colour, its back mottled with medium brown, and the eyes more than half the length of its snout. The first dorsal spine is followed by fleshy filaments. There is one barbel on the lower jaw and two on the snout. The upper jaw has long pointed teeth.

Habitat

Bigeye rockling live in the northeastern Atlantic Ocean.

Behaviour

Bigeye rockling feed on crustaceans. It breeds in early spring.

References

Lotidae
Fish described in 1867
Taxa named by Albert Günther